Maní is a town and municipality in the Department of Casanare, Colombia.

References

Municipalities of Casanare Department